Larry Dean Dixon (August 31, 1942 – December 4, 2020) was an American politician who was a Republican member of the Alabama Senate.

Political career
Dixon represented the 25th District from 1983 to 2010. He did not seek re-election in 2010 and retired from elective politics. Previously he was a member of the Alabama House of Representatives from 1978 through 1982.

In 1982, as a Democrat in District 81, he defeated later District 73 Representative Perry O. Hooper Jr., of Montgomery. Just a few months after being sworn into the state senate, Dixon switched parties and became a Republican. Regardless of party affiliation, Dixon never had any trouble at the ballot box. His lowest margin was 74 percent in what would be his last bid for reelection, one of only four times that he even faced opposition during his four decades in the capital.

From 1981 until 2016, he was the chair of the Alabama Board of Medical Examiners. He also served as a member of the Intergovernmental Advisory council on Education during the Reagan Administration.

However, he lost to newspaper publisher Terry Everett in what most considered an upset.

Death 
Dixon died from COVID-19 in Montgomery, Alabama, on December 4, 2020, at the age of 78, two weeks after an outdoor social gathering with others, at least two of whom had tested positive for the virus amid the COVID-19 pandemic in Alabama. 

His last words were a warning for people to take the virus seriously, saying: "We messed up. We let our guard down. Please tell everybody to be careful. This is real, and if you get diagnosed, get help immediately."

References

External links 
 Alabama State Legislature – Senator Larry Dixon - official government website
 Project Vote Smart – Senator Larry Dixon (AL) profile
 Follow the Money – Larry Dixon
 2006 2002 1998 campaign contributions
 

|-

|-

Alabama state senators
Members of the Alabama House of Representatives
1942 births
2020 deaths
Alabama Democrats
Alabama Republicans
Politicians from Montgomery, Alabama
People from Nowata, Oklahoma
Deaths from the COVID-19 pandemic in Alabama